This is a list of NRO Launch (NROL) designations, i.e. satellites operated by the United States National Reconnaissance Office. Those missions are generally classified, so that their exact purposes and orbital elements are not published. However, amateur astronomers have managed to observe most of the satellites, and leaked information has led to the identification of many of the payloads.

Launch statistics

Launch vehicle families

Launch sites

Launch history

See also 

 List of USA satellites

References

External links 
  National Security Space Launch Report (pages 112)

NRO
Secret space vehicles